Kronenburg or Kronenbourg may refer to:

Places 
 Kronenburg, a town subsumed into Dahlem, North Rhine-Westphalia, Germany
 Kronenburg, Suriname, a village in Suriname
 Loenen-Kronenburg, a former Dutch municipality

Other uses 
 Kronenbourg 1664, French or German beer produced by Kronenbourg Brewery 
 Kronenburg B.V., fire-service vehicles manufacturer, based in Wanroij, Netherlands
 Kronenburg tram stop, in Amstelveen, Netherlands

See also
Cronenberg (disambiguation)
Kronenberg (disambiguation)